Heroes for Hope: Starring the X-Men is a 1985 Marvel comic book designed to raise awareness about hunger in Africa. Proceeds from the comic went to the American Friends Service Committee, to assist in their work on behalf of  African famine relief and recovery. Published in the form of a "comic jam" or exquisite corpse, the book featured an all-star lineup of comics creators as well as a few notable authors from outside the comic book industry, such as Stephen King, George R. R. Martin, and Edward Bryant. It also saw a rare Alan Moore Marvel Comics credit outside his early Marvel UK work.

Heroes for Hope featured some memorable artist/writer and penciler/inker pairings, including Stan Lee and John Buscema; Stephen King and Bernie Wrightson; Moore and Richard Corben; Harlan Ellison, Frank Miller, and Bill Sienkiewicz; Mike Baron and Steve Rude, Howard Chaykin inked by Walt Simonson; and John Byrne and Terry Austin reuniting on the X-Men.

Speakeasy magazine reported in April 1986 that Heroes for Hope had raised $150,000 for the American Friends Service Committee.

Publication history 
Heroes for Hope came about in response to the devastating 1983–85 famine in Ethiopia. The concept was in the spirit of contemporaneous musical fund-raisers like Band Aid's "Do They Know It's Christmas?", USA for Africa's "We Are the World", and the Live Aid concerts. Then-Marvel Comics editor-in-chief Jim Shooter described the genesis of the project this way:

In addition to the contributors donating their work for the project, so did logo designer Janet Jackson and Marvel's production staff; while Curtis Circulation Company and all the direct market distributors and comics specialty shops donated their profits.

Plot 
The comic book opens with Rachel Summers poking her head out of the X-Mansion to grab the mail, only to be confronted with a horrible sight. The X-Men rush to the entrance to see that the mansion has somehow been transported to the middle of a barren desert.

After retrieving the comatose mail carrier, Wolverine senses that all is not right, and claws him in the face. But it turns out that it was all an illusion. The X-Men go back to business as usual after this fiasco, but then things begin to go wrong. One by one, a series of psychic assaults is launched on each member of the team, as they are subjected to their greatest subconscious fears.

First Colossus (with art by Byrne and Austin) is mocked by steely apparitions of his teammates. This is more than he can bear, and he curls up in a fetal position. Kitty Pryde, as told by King, Wrightson, and inker Jeff Jones, goes to grab something from the refrigerator only to be surprised by an evil Death-type being in a cloak. He exposes Kitty's great fear of going hungry. As told by Bill Mantlo, Charles Vess, and Jon J Muth, Nightcrawler finds Kitty turned into a wizened old hag, which leads to his own experience, focusing on Christian imagery and moral dilemmas. Kurt is offered the chance to sacrifice himself so that one other person might breath the air and eat the food he would. He declines, and thinks himself a coward. Thanks to Moore and Richard Corben, the next to fall prey to the spiritual onslaught is Magneto, who is offered a glimpse of a world where his dream of mutant supremacy has been realized — and that it's not all it's cracked up to be. Rachel is swept back to her past, where she's confronted by a horde of mutant-hunting doppelgänger Hounds, reminding her of her part in that dystopian future. Wolverine, by Ellison, Miller, and inker Sienkiewicz, must confront the tension between his human and animal sides. Claremont, Brian Bolland, and P. Craig Russell depict Storm confronted by a carnival ringmaster, who traps her in a house of mirrors. She is shown various images of her possible self, each one more distorted than the last. Ororo gets drawn into the crazy carnival games, and in the first concrete expression of the story's theme, she realizes that it is wrong to waste food. Having defeated the psychic attacker by feeding illusory cream pies to illusory people, Storm returns to her teammates for discussion of what has transpired.

Courtesy of Rachel's powers, the X-Men track the psychic presence that's been harassing them to the continent of Africa. They fly the Blackbird to the source, where they are met with horrible scenes of deprivation. Before long, a fleet of C-130 Hercules transport aircraft arrive, full of supplies, which the X-Men help distribute.

That night, Rogue becomes so frustrated that she has not had her turn of psychic punishment yet that she decides to hunt down the entity herself. She sneaks around the campsite stealing her teammates' powers. Using the psychic powers of Rachel Summers, the Rogue hybrid traces the presence of the X-Men's harasser to a desert hideaway. Upon entering the crypt, Rogue is attacked by the avatar of the psychic being. Things are not going well for Rogue when Storm appears to give aid. The "entity" is revealed to be a primeval god-force that feeds on human despair. One by one, the X-Men awake from their Rogue-induced comas and join in the battle.

The X-Men finally defeat the entity and return to their campsite, where they resume the enormous task of feeding the starving refugees. They realize their battle with the entity was a metaphor for the fight against famine, and indeed any human struggle. Kitty expresses fear that the entity survived the battle and is ready to strike again, but Wolverine comforts her with words of hope.

Contributors 
Heroes for Hope featured a story by Chris Claremont, Ann Nocenti, Bernie Wrightson, Jim Starlin, and Jim Shooter. The editors were Nocenti and Claremont; the assistant editors were Pat Blevins and Terry Kavanagh. Front cover was made by Arthur Adams and back cover by Starlin. Logo design by Janet Jackson.

Awards 
Heroes for Hope producers Jim Starlin and Bernie Wrightson were co-recipients of the 1986 Bob Clampett Humanitarian Award for their work on the book.

See also 
 Heroes Against Hunger
 9-11 (comics)

Notes

References 

1985 comics debuts
1985 in comics
Art for charity
Comics by Alan Moore
Comics by Archie Goodwin (comics)
Comics by Chris Claremont
Comics by Dennis O'Neil
Comics by Frank Miller (comics)
Comics by Howard Chaykin
Comics by Jim Starlin
Comics by John Byrne (comics)
Comics by Louise Simonson
Comics by Stan Lee
Comics by Stephen King
Comics by Steve Englehart
Comics by Walt Simonson
Marvel Comics one-shots